The United Nations Economic Commission for Africa (UNECA or ECA; , CEA) was established in 1958 by the United Nations Economic and Social Council to encourage economic cooperation among its member states (the nations of the African continent) following a recommendation of the United Nations General Assembly.

It is one of five regional commissions.

The ECA has 54 member states, corresponding to the 54 member states of the United Nations that lie within the continent of Africa or in oceans nearby the continent.

Programme 
The commission's work is structured into seven programme divisions:
 African Centre for Statistics
 Macroeconomic Policy
 Social development Policy
 Innovation and Technology
 Regional integration and Trade
Capacity Development

Locations 
 Addis Ababa, Ethiopia (Headquarters, Africa Hall, opened 1961)
 Yaoundé, Cameroon (Central African subregional headquarters)
 Kigali, Rwanda (East African subregional headquarters)
 Rabat, Morocco (North African subregional headquarters)
 Lusaka, Zambia (Southern African subregional headquarters)
 Niamey, Niger (West African subregional headquarters)

Member States

Executive Secretaries

See also

 United Nations System
 United Nations Economic and Social Commission for Western Asia overlapping membership

References

External links
 

United Nations Development Group
Economic Commission for Africa
Organizations established in 1958
Organisations based in Addis Ababa
Ethiopia and the United Nations
1958 establishments in Africa